Rodzinka.pl is a Polish comedy series directed by Patrick Yoka, aired on TVP2 since 2 March 2011, based on the Canadian script . do 3 May 2020, TVP2 based on the since 3 May 2020,

Plot 
The series is about the Boska (Divine) family of five living in Warsaw. The lady of the house is Natalia (Małgorzata Kożuchowska), head of a women's magazine publishing house. Her husband is Ludwik (Tomasz Karolak), an architect. Together they raise three children: Tomek (Maciej Musiał), Kuba (Adam Zdrójkowski) and Kacper (Mateusz Pawłowski).

Cast and characters

Characters 
 Natalia Boska zd Lipska – head of the women's magazine publishing house, wife of Ludwik
 Ludwik Boski – architect, Natalia's husband, son of Edward and Celina (episode 115)
 Tomasz Boski – the eldest son of Natalia and Ludwik, brother of Jakub and Kacper, fiancé of Magda and father of Maja
 Jakub Boski – middle son of Natalia and Ludwik, brother of Tom and Kacper
 Kacper Boski - the youngest son of Natalia and Ludwik, brother of Tom and Kuba
 Maja Boska – daughter of Tom and Magda
 Marysia – a friend of the family
 Marek Nawrocki – a friend of the family
 Janina i Zenon Lipscy – Natalia's parents
 Filip – a friend of Kuba
 Zosia Zalewska – Kacper's friend
 Antek – Kacper's friend
 Bartek – Kacper's friend
 Bolo, właśc Bolebor – Tomek's friend
 Maciek – Tomek's friend
 Paula – Kuba's girlfriend in seasons 5-12
 Agata Matuszkiewicz – Kuba's girlfriend in seasons 2-4, other seasons just friend
 Magda – in seasons 2-5, from 7, Tomek's girlfriend and then Tomek's fiancée and the mother of their daughter Maja
 Viola – Antek's mother, a friend of Boscy family
 Jan – Magda's father
 Beata – Magda's mother

Episodes

Production 
The production of the first series started on 16 November 2010 and ended on 11 February 2011. At the end of March 2011, the second series of the series was confirmed, the production of which started on 19 May 2011 and ended in September 2011. The TVP2 series returned to the air on 7 September 2012. The interruption in its broadcast was connected, among other things, with the compulsory schooling of the underage actors. The third series began on 6 March 2012 and ended on 10 November 2012.

During the shooting of the 3rd series of the series, it was decided that the 4th series will be made, the production of which began on 20 November 2012 and ended on 7 May 2013. The production of the 5th series began on 8 May 2013 and ended on 30 October of the same year. On the occasion of the broadcasting of the 5th series of the series, a miniseries entitled "Boscy w sieci" (The Divine on the Web) also began to be broadcast.

On 30 October 2013, the production of TVP confirmed that the 6th series of the series will be produced. Production was to start on 19 May, and the premiere was planned for the autumn of 2014, but a few days before the start of production, it was announced that due to Małgorzata Kożuchowska's pregnancy, the production of the 6th series was postponed to the end of 2014, and the broadcast was scheduled for spring 2015.

References

Bibliography 
 Rodzinka.pl from the collection  of  filmpolski.pl

External links 
 

2011 Polish television series debuts
Polish comedy television series